The 5th Daytime Emmy Awards were held on Wednesday, June 7, 1978, on ABC, to commemorate excellence in American daytime programming from the previous year (1977). The awards were hosted by Family Feud host Richard Dawson, who also won an award for best game show host. Airing from 3 to 4:30 p.m. EST, the telecast preempted General Hospital and The Edge of Night.

Winners in each category are in bold.

Outstanding Daytime Drama Series
All My Children
Days of Our Lives
Ryan's Hope
The Young and the Restless

Outstanding Actor in a Daytime Drama Series
Matthew Cowles (Billy Clyde Tuggle, All My Children)
Lawrence Keith (Nick Davis, All My Children)
James Pritchett (Dr. Matt Powers, The Doctors)
Michael Storm (Dr. Larry Wolek, One Life to Live)
Michael Levin (Jack Fenelli, Ryan's Hope)
Andrew Robinson (Frank Ryan, Ryan's Hope)

Outstanding Actress in a Daytime Drama Series
Mary Fickett (Ruth Martin, All My Children)
Susan Lucci (Erica Kane, All My Children)
Laurie Heineman (Sharlene Frame, Another World)
Beverlee McKinsey (Iris Carrington, Another World)
Victoria Wyndham (Rachel Davis, Another World)
Susan Seaforth Hayes (Julie Olson, Days of our Lives)
Jennifer Harmon (Cathy Craig, One Life to Live)

Outstanding Daytime Drama Series Writing
 Guiding Light
 Days of our Lives
 All My Children
 Ryan's Hope

Outstanding Daytime Drama Series Directing
 Another World
 Days of our Lives
 Ryan's Hope
 As the World Turns
 Love of Life
 The Young and the Restless

Outstanding Game or Audience Participation Show
The Hollywood Squares - A Heatter-Quigley Production for NBC
Family Feud - A Mark Goodson-Bill Todman Production for ABC
The $20,000 Pyramid - A Bob Stewart Production for ABC

Outstanding Host or Hostess in a Game or Audience Participation Show
Richard Dawson (Family Feud)
Dick Clark (The $20,000 Pyramid)
Peter Marshall (The Hollywood Squares)
Chuck Woolery (Wheel of Fortune)
Susan Stafford (Wheel of Fortune)

Outstanding Host or Hostess in a Talk, Service or Variety Series
Phil Donahue (Donahue)
Dinah Shore (Dinah!)

External links
IMDb

005
1978 television awards